Rafael Vitor Santos de Freitas (born 5 January 1993), commonly known as Rafael Vitor, is a Brazilian footballer who plays as a centre-back for Malaysia Super League club Penang.

Career
On 3 August 2021, Rafael Vitor scored the fastest goal in the Malaysia Super League when he scored a goal just 9 seconds after the opening whistle against Perak FC. In addition, he also scored a hat-trick in a 3-5 win for Penang.

Honours

Club
Penang
 Malaysia Premier League: 2020

References

1993 births
Living people
Brazilian footballers
Brazilian expatriate footballers
Association football defenders
Boa Esporte Clube players
Penang F.C. players
Malaysia Super League players
Brazilian expatriate sportspeople in Malaysia
Expatriate footballers in Malaysia